George Townsend (born 29 July 1957) is a former English footballer who played as a defender.

His son Ryan Townsend was also a professional football player.

References

1957 births
Living people
English footballers
Association football defenders
Rochdale A.F.C. players
English Football League players